Wheatland or Wheatlands may refer to:

Places

Canada
 Wheatland County, Alberta
 Rural Municipality of Wheatlands No. 163, Saskatchewan

Scotland
 Wheatlands, an area of Blantyre, South Lanarkshire

United States
 Wheatland, California
 Wheatland, Indiana
 Wheatland, Iowa
 Wheatland, Michigan
 Wheatland, Minnesota
 Wheatland, Missouri
 Wheatland, Montana
 Wheatland County, Montana
 Wheatland, New Mexico
 Wheatland, New York
 Wheatland, North Dakota
 Wheatland, Oklahoma
 Wheatland, Pennsylvania
 Wheatland, Kenosha County, Wisconsin
 Wheatland, Vernon County, Wisconsin
 Wheatland, Wyoming

Historic sites 

 Wheatland (James Buchanan House), former residence of President James Buchanan near Lancaster, Pennsylvania
 Wheatland (Knob Creek, Washington County, Tennessee), a historic house
 Wheatlands (Sevierville, Tennessee), listed on the NRHP in Tennessee
 Wheatland (Callao, Virginia), listed on the NRHP in Virginia
 Wheatland Manor, Fincastle, Virginia, listed on the NRHP in Virginia
 Wheatland (Loretto, Virginia), listed on the NRHP in Virginia

Other uses
 The Wheatland Music Festival, held in Michigan the weekend after Labor Day each year

See also
 Wheatland Township (disambiguation)